Ryan Hartslief (born 28 February 1978 in Cork) is a retired Irish footballer and rugby player.

Early life
Hartslief was born in the Irish city of Cork and raised in Springs, Gauteng in South Africa who attended 1998 to the Rand Afrikaans University and studies between 2000 BCOM Sports Management.

Career
He played in South Africa for Kaizer Chiefs, Black Leopards, Golden Arrows and Hellenic FC.

Retirement
Hartslief is currently active as a player agent, and runs the Big Time Sports Management agency.

Rugby
He played after his retirement one year in 2006 Rugby for the Welkom Rovers in South Africa.

References

1979 births
Living people
Businesspeople from County Cork
Sportspeople from Cork (city)
Republic of Ireland association footballers
Kaizer Chiefs F.C. players
Irish rugby union players
Black Leopards F.C. players
Expatriate soccer players in South Africa
Hellenic F.C. players
Association football defenders